Mogalturru is a village in West Godavari district of the Indian state of Andhra Pradesh. It was a princely state during the British rule.

Geography
It has an average elevation of 1 meter (6 feet). NH 214A passes through the village.

History
Mogalturru is notable for ancient Kalidindi Zamindari clan and a mud fort.

Mogalturru is best known for the ancient Kalidindi Zamindari clan and a mud fort connected to the ancient Vishnukundina dynasty. The Zamindari territory expands to West Godavari and parts of Krishna District. The biggest of the ten forts which has survived the ravages of time is the Mogalturru Fort in which the family of the erstwhile kingdom still lives.

Demographics 

 Census of India, Mogalturru had a population of 24,189. The total population constituted of, 12,089 males, and 12,100 females with a sex ratio of 1,001 females per 1,000 males. 2,347 children were in the age group of 0–6 years, with the sex ratio of 987. The average literacy rate stood at 75.02%.

Notable people 

 Krishnam Raju, actor, politician, former cabinet minister for Defence and for External Affairs
 Prabhas, actor
 Chiranjeevi, actor, former cabinet minister for State-Tourism, ex-president of Praja Rajyam Party
 Pawan Kalyan, actor, president of Jana Sena Party
 Naga Babu, artist
 Ram Charan, actor

References

Villages in West Godavari district